Venustoma is a genus of sea snails, marine gastropod mollusks in the family Mangeliidae.

Species
Species within the genus Venustoma include:
 Venustoma harucoa Bartsch, 1941
 Venustoma lacunosa (Gould, 1860)

References

 Bartsch, Paul, The Nomenclatorial Status of Certain Northern Turritid Mollusks; Proceedings of the Biological Society of Washington vol. 54, 1941

External links
  Bouchet, P.; Kantor, Y. I.; Sysoev, A.; Puillandre, N. (2011). A new operational classification of the Conoidea (Gastropoda). Journal of Molluscan Studies. 77(3): 273-308
 Worldwide Mollusc Species Data Base: Mangeliidae

 
Gastropod genera